Maico Casella Schuth (born 5 June 1997) is an Argentine field hockey player who plays as a forward for San Fernando and the Argentine national team.

Club career
Casella started playing hockey at age six in Argentina for San Fernando. In July 2019, he signed for HGC in the Netherlands. He scored 27 goals in two seasons for HGC and he left them in 2021 for another Dutch club HC Tilburg, where he signed for two seasons. In his first season at Tilburg they were relegated and he did not stay in Tilburg for his second season. On 8 July 2022 it was announced he would return to HGC. Due to personal reasons he returned to Argentina in the middle of the 2022–23 season.

International career

Junior national team
In 2014, Casella made his debut for Argentina, representing the Under 18 national team at a qualifier for the 2014 Summer Youth Olympics. At the tournament, Argentina finished in first place, with Casella scoring 18 goals. He represented the junior national team at the Pan American Junior Championship in Toronto, Canada. At the tournament he scored 18 goals, helping Argentina to a gold medal and qualification to the Junior World Cup. Casella again represented Argentina at the Junior World Cup in Lucknow, India, where the team finished 5th.

Senior national team
Casella debuted for the senior national team in 2015, in a test series against the United States, in Boston. He was selected for the 2018 World Cup, where he played in all four games. In July 2019, he was selected in the Argentina squad for the 2019 Pan American Games. They won the gold medal by defeating Canada 5-2 in the final. He was the joint-topscorer of the competition with ten goals together with Leandro Tolini. In December 2019, he was nominated for the FIH Rising Star of the Year Award. On 25 June 2021, he was chosen to represent Argentina at the 2020 Summer Olympics.

Honours
Argentina U21
 Pan American Junior Championship: 2016

Argentina
 Pan American Games gold medal: 2019
 Pan American Cup: 2017, 2022

References

External links

1997 births
Living people
Field hockey players from Buenos Aires
Argentine male field hockey players
Male field hockey forwards
2018 Men's Hockey World Cup players
Field hockey players at the 2019 Pan American Games
Field hockey players at the 2020 Summer Olympics
Pan American Games gold medalists for Argentina
Pan American Games medalists in field hockey
HGC players
Men's Hoofdklasse Hockey players
Expatriate field hockey players
Argentine expatriate sportspeople in the Netherlands
Medalists at the 2019 Pan American Games
Olympic field hockey players of Argentina
2023 Men's FIH Hockey World Cup players
21st-century Argentine people